Stade Maniang Soumaré is a multi-use stadium in Thiès, Senegal.  It is currently used mostly for football matches and serves as a home ground of US Rail. The stadium holds 8,000 people.

Maniang Soumare